Battersby Hats was the trading name of Battersby & Co, a hat manufacturer of Stockport, England. The firm once had a capacity of 12,000 hats per week but it declined in the second half of the twentieth century and merged with other hat manufacturers in 1966 before hat production ceased altogether in 1997.

History
Battersby's Hat Factory in Offerton, Stockport, first appeared on Ordnance Survey maps in 1895. At one time, Battersby employed over 1,000 people.

In May 1906, a fire gutted their factory at Offerton. The fire started on the evening of the 22nd and burned all night destroying the warehouse and "enormous stocks" of straw and felt hats and part of the working area. The cost of the damage was estimated at about £50,000.

In 1907, they bought a second factory in Conty, near Arras in the north of France. William John Battersby's son, Edgar died there in the 1917 Battle of Arras, and his son Ernest, who managed the factory died on 1 October 1918 at Yvetot, near Rouen from tuberculosis.

At one time, the firm was one of the largest hat manufacturers in Britain with an international trade. For an Australian court case of 1935, James Johnson Battersby sent evidence that his company had the capacity to produce 12,000 hats per week. They had London offices in Nicholl Square, EC1, and later at 5 Roseberry Avenue, London, EC1.

In 1966, Battersby merged with four other felt hat manufacturers, Christy & Co Ltd and T. & W. Lees Ltd, both of Stockport, and J. Moores & Sons Ltd, and Joseph Wilson & Sons Ltd, both of Denton, to form Associated British Hat Manufacturers.

Closure
After a gradual decline, hat production at Associated British Hat Manufacturers eventually ceased in 1997. The factory was used as the first Hat Works museum before the exhibitions were moved to the newly renovated Wellington Mill on the A6 in the centre of Stockport in 2000.

In 2019 Viaduct Housing Partnership and Lane End Group began work on a development at the Hempshaw Lane site for 144 homes.

See also
James Larratt Battersby

References

External links 

Defunct manufacturing companies of the United Kingdom
Companies based in Stockport
Hat companies
1895 establishments in England
Clothing companies established in 1895
Battersby family
British companies established in 1895
Manufacturing companies disestablished in 1966
1966 disestablishments in England